Raziel Samir Fernando García Paredes (born 15 February 1994), better known as Raziel García, is a Peruvian professional footballer who plays as a midfielder for Cienciano and the Peru national team.

International career 

García was called up to the Peru national football team for the 2021 Copa América and made his senior international debut on June 20, 2021, coming off the bench in a 2–1 victory over Colombia.

References

External links

Peruvian footballers
Cienciano footballers
Peruvian Primera División players
Club Deportivo Universidad César Vallejo footballers
Club Deportivo Universidad de San Martín de Porres players
Unión Huaral footballers
Peru international footballers
Association football midfielders
People from Lima
1994 births
Living people
2021 Copa América players